The Sampson Independent is an American, English language daily newspaper headquartered in Clinton, Sampson County, North Carolina.  The paper is a member of the North Carolina Press Association.

History
The lineage of the Sampson Independent includes the following newspapers:
 The News Dispatch, the Sampson Democrat. (Clinton, N.C.) (1924 - 1924)
 The Sampsonian. (Clinton, N.C.) (19??-1976)

See also
 List of newspapers in North Carolina

References

Daily newspapers published in North Carolina
Sampson County, North Carolina